Catocala ohshimai is a moth in the family Erebidae. It is found in China (Shaanxi).

References

ohshimai
Moths described in 2001
Moths of Asia